Roger Beck (born 3 August 1983) is a former international footballer from Liechtenstein who last played club football for FC Balzers, as a midfielder.

Career
Beck formerly played for FC Schaan, USV Eschen/Mauren, VfB Hohenems and FC Blau-Weiß Feldkirch.

Beck earned 43 caps for Liechtenstein and scored one goal (in a Euro 2004 qualifier against Macedonia) between 2003 and 2009, including 16 FIFA World Cup qualifying matches.

References

1983 births
Living people
Liechtenstein footballers
Liechtenstein international footballers
FC Balzers players
Association football midfielders